Ethnic cleansing is the systematic forced removal of ethnic, racial and religious groups from a given area, with the intent of making a region ethnically homogeneous.

Ethnic Cleansing may also refer to:

 Ethnic Cleansing (video game)
 "Ethnic Cleansing", a song by Malevolent Creation from Stillborn